The Supreme Force of Eternity is the debut album by Runemagick.

Track listing
  "At the Horizons End"   – 8:01  
  "The Black Wall"   – 4:14  
  "When Death Is the Key"   – 4:29  
  "For You, My Death"   – 3:52  
  "Curse of the Dark Rune"   – 3:20  
  "Nocturnal Creation"   – 4:58  
  "The Supreme Force"   – 4:37  
  "Sign of Eternity (Pt. II)"   – 2:53

Credits
 Nicklas "Terror" Rudolfsson - Vocals, Guitar
 Jonas Blom - Drums
 Fredrik Johnsson - Guitar
 Peter Palmdahl - Bass
 Fredrik Nordström - keyboards

Runemagick albums
1998 debut albums